Wigan West is an electoral ward in Wigan, England. It forms part of Wigan Metropolitan Borough Council, as well as the parliamentary constituency of Wigan.

Councillors 
The ward is represented by three councillors: Phyllis Cullen (Lab), Stephen Dawber (Lab), and Terence Halliwell (Lab).

 indicates seat up for re-election.
 indicates seat won in by-election.

Notes and references

Wigan Metropolitan Borough Council Wards